Anthony James Polinelli (born 18 February 1943) is a former Australian rules footballer who played with Geelong in the Victorian Football League (VFL) during the early 1960s.

Football
Polinelli started his career as a rover but developed into a dashing wingman. 

On 6 July 1963 he was a member of the Geelong team that were comprehensively and unexpectedly beaten by Fitzroy, 9.13 (67) to 3.13 (31) in the 1963 Miracle Match. He was a reserve in Geelong's 1963 premiership side and only appeared on the field briefly during the last quarter. 

It is said that he had a pipe which he would smoke during the half time of matches.

He was shortlisted for the VFL/AFL Italian Team of the Century but didn't make the final cut.

Athletics
Geelong encouraged him to train with Arthur Edgerton, a specialist sprint coach based in Geelong. Under Edgerton's guidance Polinelli won the 1966 Bendigo Gift before finishing second to Wodonga's Bill Howard in the 1966 Stawell Gift.

See also
 1963 Miracle Match

References

External links

1943 births
Australian rules footballers from Victoria (Australia)
Geelong Football Club players
Geelong Football Club Premiership players
Maryborough Football Club players
Living people
One-time VFL/AFL Premiership players